GB 12052-89, entitled Korean character coded character set for information interchange, is a Korean-language character set standard established by China. It consists of a total of 5,979 characters, and has no relationship nor compatibility with South Korea's KS X 1001 and North Korea's KPS 9566.

Characters 
Characters in GB 12052 are arranged in a 94×94 grid (as in ISO/IEC 2022), and the two-byte code point of each character is expressed in the qu-wei form, which specifies a row (qu 区) and the position of the character within the row (cell, wei 位).

The rows (numbered from 1 to 94) contain characters as follows:
 01–09: identical to GB 2312, except 03-04 (￥ in GB 2312, ＄ in GB 12052)
 16–37: modern hangul syllables and jamo, level 1 (2,017 syllables and 51 jamo)
 38–52: modern hangul syllables, level 2 (1,356 characters)
 53–72: archaic hangul syllables and jamo (1,683 syllables and 96 jamo), and 94 Chinese characters
The rows 10–15 and 73–94 are unassigned.

Errors 
There are some errors in the standard:
 41-64: 믃 in the fold-out table, 믌 in the standard proper – should be 믃
 46-65: 틘 in the fold-out table, 퇸 in the standard proper – should be 틘
 49-37: 뗸 in the fold-out table, 뎬 in the standard proper – should be 뗸
 51-82: 윹 in the fold-out table, 율 in the standard proper – should be 윹
 53-67: ᄀᆈ in the fold-out table, missing in the standard proper – should be ᄀᆈ
 72-88: missing in the fold-out table, 夞 in the standard proper – should be 夞

See also 
 Languages of China
 List of modern Hangul characters in ISO/IEC 2022–compliant national character set standards

References

External links 
 
 

Encodings of Asian languages
Korean-language computing
12052
Hangul